is a Swedish association for men, founded in 1862 in Stockholm.

Founding 
Sällskapet Idun traces its founding back to 22 November 1862 at the Hotel Fenix in Stockholm, Sweden. Its founders consisted of Edward Bergh and Johan Fredrik Höckert, artists and professors at the Royal Swedish Academy of Fine Arts; Adolf Erik Nordenskiöld, researcher and professor at the Swedish Museum of Natural History; Axel Key, professor and rector of the Karolinska Institute; Harald Wieselgren, librarian of the National Library, and composer Ivar Hallström. Wieselgren, as secretary, was the unifying and driving force for several decades. He is the main character in Zorn's painting  ('A Toast in the Idun Society') from 1892.

Activity 
The statutes of 1862 stated that the association was for "men living in Stockholm who have their own activities and interests in science, literature and art in various fields." According to the latest revised statutes of 6 December 2000, the organization's mission is "to promote interaction between people active in different cultural fields."

 meets once a month, except during the summer months, with lectures and art sessions at which artists give insights into their work. The November meeting is devoted to music.

The association is governed by an annually elected board, whose chairman is appointed from within the board. The secretary is responsible for the day-to-day running of the association, together with a treasurer and a club master, also appointed at the annual general meeting. New members are elected in the order provided for by the statutes by the committee on the proposal of at least two members. The number of members has been between 550 and 600 for a long time.

Similar associations 
In Denmark there is a similar society, and in Norway .

Asteroid 176 Iduna 
The asteroid 176 Iduna was named after the association.

References

Notes

Sources

Further reading

External links 

 Sällskapet Idun – the association's homepage 

Organizations established in 1862
Clubs and societies in Sweden
Men's organizations